Brian Lunn (1893–1956) was a British writer and translator.

He was born in Bloomsbury, London, youngest of three sons (there being also a daughter) of Methodist parents Sir Henry Simpson Lunn (1859-1939) and Mary Ethel, née Moore, daughter of a canon. He had a somewhat Puritanical upbringing, his father, founder of Lunn's Travel agency that would become Lunn Poly, having strong religious beliefs which were in conflict with his talent as a businessman. Arnold Lunn and Hugh Kingsmill were his brothers. In the mid-1920s Lunn was living at  50 Manchester St, London, W1.

His most important work as a writer was 'Switchback', his autobiography published in 1948. Its highlight is Brian's description of a mental breakdown he had while serving in Mesopotamia in the 11th Black Watch. The onset of his breakdown was described as follows:

His other books include a biography of Martin Luther, an "autobiography" of Satan which he "collated" in collaboration with William Gerhardie, a travel guide to Belgium, and a history of the Rothschild family. "Salvation Dynasty" was Brian Lunn's account of the Salvation Army's founders.

Books
 Silbermann by Jacques De Lacretelle, translator Brian Lunn (1923)
 Austria in Dissolution by  Stephan Burian Von Rajecz, translator Brian Lunn (1925)
 Letters to Young Winter Sportsmen - Skiing, Skating and Curling (1927)
 From Serfdom to Bolshevism. The Memoirs of Baron N. Wrangel, 1847-1920, translators Brian and Beatrix Lunn (1927)
 The Reign of the House of Rothschild by Count Egon Caesar Corti, translators Brian and Beatrix Lunn (1928)
 The Life of Alfred Nobel by H. Schuck and R. Sohlman, translator Brian Lunn (1929)
 The Cabaret Up the Line by Roland Dorgelès, translators Brian Lunn and Alan Duncan (1930)
 The Woman with a Thousand Children by Clara Viebig, translator Brian Lunn (1930)
 Religious Essays: A Supplement to 'The Idea of the Holy''' by Rudolf Otto, translator Brian Lunn (1931)
 The Memoirs Of Satan, William Gerhardi and Brian Lunn (1932)
 Martin Luther: the man and his God (1934)
 Salvation Dynasty: On William Booth and his family (1935). Lunn contributed the chapter on John Fisher and Hugh Latimer.
 The Great Tudors, ed. Katharine Garvin (1936)
 The Charm of Belgium (1939)
 Switchback: an autobiography'' (1948)

References

1893 births
1956 deaths
British travel writers
English autobiographers
English biographers